Jakosits is a surname. Notable people with the surname include:

Michael Jakosits (born 1970), German sport shooter
Tibor Jakosits (born 1938), Hungarian sport shooter